Pavle Bulatović (Serbian Cyrillic: Павле Булатовић; 13 December 1948 – 7 February 2000) was a Yugoslav politician.

Bulatović served as Interior Minister of Montenegro from 1990 to 1992, then as Federal Minister of Interior of FR Yugoslavia and as Minister of Defence of the Federal Republic of Yugoslavia from 1993 until his assassination in 2000.

Death
He was shot dead in Belgrade on the evening of 7 February 2000. The shooting took place at the restaurant of FK Rad in the Belgrade suburb of Banjica. Bulatović later died at the Military Medical Academy in Belgrade. Bulatović represented the Socialist People's Party of Montenegro which was then allied in government with the Socialist Party of Serbia, led by Slobodan Milošević.

References

External links
 BBC profile
 Profile, Rulers.org

1948 births
2000 deaths
People from Kolašin
Rovčani
Democratic Party of Socialists of Montenegro politicians
Socialist People's Party of Montenegro politicians
Montenegrin economists
University of Montenegro Faculty of Economics alumni
Assassinated Montenegrin politicians
Deaths by firearm in Serbia
People murdered in Serbia
Assassinations in Serbia
Unsolved murders in Serbia
2000 murders in Serbia
Burials in Montenegro